Amirabad (also Romanized as Amīrābād) is a village in Deyhuk Rural District, Deyhuk District, Tabas County, South Khorasan Province, Iran. At the 2006 census, its population was 81, with 24 families.

References 

Populated places in Tabas County